Jean-Marc Noël Aveline (born 26 December 1958) is a French prelate of the Catholic Church who was named Archbishop of Marseille on 8 August 2019 after serving as an auxiliary bishop there since 2013.

On 27 August 2022, Pope Francis made Aveline a cardinal.

Biography
Jean-Marc Aveline was born on 26 December 1958 in Sidi Bel Abbes, in French Algeria. In 1966 his family moved to Marseille. His father was a railway worker and the family lived in SNCF housing in the Saint-Barthélemy neighborhood. He studied at the inter-diocesan seminary of Avignon from 1977 to 1979. He then joined the Carmes Seminary of Paris to study at the Catholic University of Paris where he earned a doctorate in theology in 2000. He also earned a licenciate in philosophy at the Sorbonne.

He was ordained a priest of the Archdiocese of Marseille on 3 November 1984. He taught theology and was director of studies at the interdiocesan seminary in Marseille and performed parish work at the Saint-Marcel parish. Moving to the parish of Saint-Pierre and Saint Paul, he served as episcopal vicar for permanent formation from 1987 to 2007. He led the Archdiocese's vocation service from 1991 to 1996. In 1992 he founded the Institut des sciences et de théologie des religions of Marseille (ISTR) and was its director for the next ten years. He was director from 1995 to 2013 of the Institut Saint-Jean, which in 1998 became the Catholic Institute of the Mediterranean and developed an association with the Faculty of Theology of Lyon. He also taught at the Faculty of Theology of the Catholic University of Lyon from 1997 to 2007. In 2007 he became vicar general of the Archdiocese of Marseille.

He was named to a five-year term as a consultant to the Pontifical Council for Interreligious Dialogue in 2007.

On 19 December 2013, Pope Francis named him titular bishop of Simidicca and auxiliary bishop of Marseille. He received his episcopal consecration on 26 January 2014 in the Marseille Cathedral from Georges Pontier, Archbishop of Marseille.

Within the Episcopal Conference of France (CEF) he has headed the council for interreligious relations since 2017.

On 8 August 2019, Pope Francis named him Archbishop of Marseille. He was installed there on 15 September. On 13 July 2022, Pope Francis named him a member of the Dicastery for Bishops.

On 27 August 2022, Pope Francis made him a cardinal priest, assigning him the title of Santa Maria ai Monti.

See also
 Cardinals created by Pope Francis

References

External links 
 
 

1958 births
Living people
People from Sidi Bel Abbès
21st-century Roman Catholic archbishops in France
21st-century French cardinals
Cardinals created by Pope Francis